In number theory, the Erdős arcsine law, named after Paul Erdős in 1969, states that the prime divisors of a number have a distribution related to the arcsine distribution.

Specifically, say that the jth prime factor p of a given number n (in the sorted sequence of distinct prime factors) is "small" when .
Then, for any fixed parameter u, in the limit as x goes to infinity, the proportion of the integers n less than x that have fewer than  small prime factors converges to

References

Number theory